The Peary Channel is a waterway in the territory of Nunavut. It is an arm of the Arctic Ocean, and it spreads southeast between Meighen Island to the north, Axel Heiberg Island to the east, Amund Ringnes Island to the south, and Ellef Ringnes Island to the west.

References

 Peary Channel at Atlas of Canada

Channels of Qikiqtaaluk Region